In Yoruba mythology, Egbere is a malevolent spirit that inhabits woods and is seen at night.

It is said to be short, owns a (small) mat, and cries all the time. Also that whoever takes the mat of wealth from him will be rich beyond imagination.

References

Yoruba mythology
West African legendary creatures